Solbakken is a Norwegian surname.

It can refer to:
 Bjarne Solbakken, alpine skier
 Erik Solbakken, television presenter
 Erik André Solbakken, competitive rower
 Håvard Solbakken, cross country skier
 Hege Solbakken, politician
 Ola Solbakken, football player
 Solveig Solbakken, politician
 Ståle Solbakken, football player and manager
 Synnøve Solbakken (politician), politician

Norwegian-language surnames